Dost is a 2001 Tamil-language action-crime film directed by S. A. Chandrasekhar. The film stars R. Sarathkumar and Abhirami whilst Raghuvaran, Prakash Raj and Indu play supporting roles.

Plot 

Vishwa (Sarathkumar) and Raghu (Raghuvaran) are the closest of friends. However, the former is true, while the latter is merely a mercenary. Nothing matters to Raghu except money. He uses his wealthy friend as a ruse to rise in status. Devoted to his selfish friend, Vishwa is too naive to know that Raghu is an archetypal scheming villain who could ruin him for money. When he does realize the truth, it is too late – he is already a wreck, estranged from his child and lover and behind bars. Now it is time for revenge.

Vishva and Ragu were friends and drinks alcohol in a boat at night time, during this time Ragu alleges that Visva loves his wife due to which Visva never marries 2nd time and hearing this Visva gets angry and beats Ragu and both finally sleeps but at morning Visva cannot see Ragu inside the boat,only blood stains are seen. Police arrest visva and in court all proof are against visva ending in life imprisonment for 7 years. But visva jumps out of jail when he gets phone call from his daughter now under custody of Ragu who going to gunshot her. Viswa traces Ragu to Goa and finally kills Ragu and saves his daughter.

Cast 

R. Sarathkumar as Vishwanathan
Abhirami as Anamika
Raghuvaran as Raghu
Prakash Raj as ACP Neelakanda Brahmachari
Indhu as Gowri
Santhana Bharathi as Judge
Sriman as Dharmaraj
Nizhalgal Ravi as Jail Superintendent
Besant Ravi as Police Inspector
Mohan Sharma as I. G.
Crazy Mohan as Astrologer
Mahanadi Shankar as Seller
Thalapathi Dinesh as Fighter
Saranya Mohan as a child in cemetery
Vadivelu as Bomb Bakri (special appearance)
Kasthuri in a special appearance
K. S. Ravikumar in a special appearance as boxing referee
Ramji in a special appearance

Production 
S. A. Chandrasekhar had written the film in the late 1990s but shelved the venture as he could not find the correct actor to portray a boxer. After receiving an offer from Lakshmi Movie Makers to direct the film, he reworked the script and cast R. Sarathkumar, alongside Prakash Raj and Raghuvaran.

Soundtrack 
Lyrics were written by Vaali.

Reception 
Malathi Rangarajan of The Hindu wrote, "The film has flashes of intelligence, splashes of humour, spurts of sentiment and mounds of melodrama. Yet the cocktail does not offer complete satiety. One reason could be the pace, affected as it is by inevitable appendages", and criticised its conspicuous similarities to the American film Double Jeopardy (1999). Visual Dasan of Kalki called the film "average".

References

External links 

2000s crime action films
2000s Tamil-language films
2000s vigilante films
2001 action thriller films
2001 crime thriller films
2001 films
Films directed by S. A. Chandrasekhar
Films scored by Deva (composer)
Indian action thriller films
Indian crime action films
Indian crime thriller films
Indian films about revenge
Indian legal films
Indian vigilante films